Geraea canescens, commonly known as desert sunflower, hairy desert sunflower, or desert gold, is an annual plant in the family Asteraceae. The genus name comes from the Greek geraios ("old man"), referring to the white hairs on the fruits.

G. canescens bears yellow sunflower-like flowers on slender, hairy stems. It flowers February through May after sufficient rainfall, and sometimes in October and November.

The plant is native to western North America, specifically Arizona, Nevada, California, and Utah. A drought-resistant annual plant, it can be found in the California, Mojave, and Sonoran Deserts. It is one of the flowers which participates in the occasional superblooms of desert flowers.

There are two varieties: 
Geraea canescens var. canescens
Geraea canescens var. paniculata S.F.Blake

The flowers attract bees and birds, and the seeds are eaten by birds and rodents.

References

External links

 Geraea canescens Torr. & Gray.  Hairy Desertsunflower.  United States Department of Agriculture Plants Profile.
 Geraea canescens.  Lady Bird Johnson Wildflower Center, University of Texas
 Picture of Desert Sunflowers in Death Valley

 Map of the Desert Sunflower's range

Heliantheae
North American desert flora
Flora of the Southwestern United States
Plants described in 1847